The South Carolina Gamecocks college football team represents the University of South Carolina in the East Division of the Southeastern Conference (SEC). The Gamecocks compete as part of the National Collegiate Athletic Association (NCAA) Division I Football Bowl Subdivision. The school has had 32 head coaches since it began play during the 1892 season. From November 2004 to October 12, 2015, Steve Spurrier served as South Carolina's head coach.

The team has played more than 1,100 games over 118 seasons of South Carolina football. Eight coaches have led the Gamecocks to the postseason bowl games: John D. McMillan, Paul Dietzel, Jim Carlen, Joe Morrison, Brad Scott, Lou Holtz, Spurrier, Will Muschamp and Shane Beamer. Paul Dietzel led South Carolina to the 1969 Atlantic Coast Conference (ACC) championship. Steve Spurrier is the leader in games won with 77 victories and counting during his 10 years with the Gamecocks. Steve Spurrier and Lou Holtz have been inducted into the College Football Hall of Fame in South Bend, Indiana.

Key

Coaches

Notes

References 
General

 
 

Specific

South Carolina Gamecocks

South Carolina sports-related lists